The Baltimore Orioles are a Major League Baseball (MLB) franchise based in Baltimore, Maryland. They play in the American League East division. The Orioles started playing in Baltimore in 1954, after moving from St. Louis, where they were known as the St. Louis Browns. The first game of the new baseball season for a team is played on Opening Day, and being named the Opening Day starter is an honor, which is often given to the player who is expected to lead the pitching staff that season, though there are various strategic reasons why a team's best pitcher might not start on Opening Day. The Orioles have used 33 different Opening Day starting pitchers in their 60 seasons since moving to Baltimore. The 33 starters have a combined Opening Day record of 22 wins, 18 losses and 17 no decisions. No decisions are only awarded to the starting pitcher if the game is won or lost after the starting pitcher has left the game.

The first Opening Day for the Orioles was played in Detroit against the Detroit Tigers on April 13, 1954. Don Larsen was the Orioles' Opening Day starting pitcher that day, in a game the Orioles lost 3–0.  Jim Palmer and Mike Mussina have made the most Opening Day starts for the Baltimore Orioles, with six apiece. Palmer has a record of five wins and one loss in his Opening Day starts, and Mussina has a record of three wins, two losses and one no decision. Dave McNally made five Opening Day starts for the Orioles, with a record of three wins and no losses.  Other Oriole pitchers who have made multiple Opening Day starts are Steve Barber, Rodrigo López, and Jeremy Guthrie, with three apiece, and Milt Pappas, Dennis Martínez, Mike Flanagan, Mike Boddicker, and Rick Sutcliffe, with two apiece.  Flanagan's two Opening Day starts occurred eight years apart, in 1978 and 1986.

Palmer has the most Opening Day wins for the Orioles, with five.  McNally's record of three wins and no losses in Opening Day starts gave him a 1.000 winning percentage, the highest in Orioles history. Flanagan's record of no wins and two losses is the lowest winning percentage of any Orioles' Opening Day starting pitcher. Flanagan and Mussina are the only pitchers to have two losses for the Orioles in Opening Day starts.

The Orioles have played in two home ballparks. Memorial Stadium was their home park until 1991, and Camden Yards has been their home park since 1992.  Orioles' Opening Day starting pitchers had a record of eight wins, eight losses and eight no decisions in 24 Opening Day starts in Memorial Stadium. They have a record of ten wins, four losses and two no decisions in 15 Opening Day starts at Camden Yards.  This makes their aggregate record in Opening Day starts at home 18 wins, 12 losses and 10 no decisions.  Their record in Opening Day starts on the road is four wins, six losses and seven no decisions, for an aggregate Opening Day record of 22 wins, 18 losses and 16 no decisions.  The Orioles played in the World Series in 1966, 1969, 1970, 1971, 1979 and 1983, winning in 1966, 1970 and 1983.  Their Opening Day starting pitchers in those years were Steve Barber (1966), Dave McNally (1969, 1970 and 1971), Jim Palmer (1979) and Dennis Martínez (1983).

Key

Pitchers

References

Opening day starters
Lists of Major League Baseball Opening Day starting pitchers